Shane Bunting (born October 21, 1975), better known by his stage name Madchild, is a Canadian rapper. He is part of the Vancouver-based hip hop group Swollen Members. In 2009, he released a solo EP titled The Madchild EP. In 2012, he released his first album, titled Dope Sick followed by Lawn Mower Man in 2013 and Silver Tongue Devil in 2015. In 1993, he was named a member of the Rock Steady Crew. The Darkest Hour was released in 2017.

Early life 
Bunting was born in Surrey, British Columbia, but was raised in North Vancouver. He attended Carson Graham and Sutherland secondary schools. He moved to San Francisco when he was 20 years old and returned to British Columbia in the mid-1990s.

Career
In August 2011, he returned to his roots by taking part in a rap battle for King of the Dot, an Ontario, Canada–based battle league. He went up against Dirtbag Dan and won on a 3–2 decision. He was scheduled to return to King of the Dot in August 2012 to battle with the Australian rapper 360, however, the battle was postponed, as 360 was scheduled to receive ocular surgery at the time of the event. Madchild has said that he is still interested in doing the battle. in 2015, Madchild competed against rapper Daylyt in KOTD's Blackout5.

Personal life
Bunting now resides in West Hollywood, California.

Bunting was addicted to the painkiller Percocet from 2006 to 2011.

Legal troubles
In early 2011, it was reported that Bunting was banned from entering the United States, due to alleged links to the Hells Angels Motorcycle Club. Bunting said that he was detained at an American airport for approximately eight hours before being told he could not enter the country, and had been working with a lawyer in San Diego, California, to rectify the situation. In July 2013, it was announced that Bunting was once again allowed to enter the United States.

Discography

Studio albums

Extended plays

Mixtapes
 M.A.D.E.: Misguided Angel Destroys Everything (2011)
 Underground Monsters (2016)
 Madchild Mondays (2017)

Guest appearances

Music videos

References

External links 
  Madchild's official website 
 Madchild on Myspace
 
 VK

1975 births
Living people
20th-century Canadian rappers
21st-century Canadian rappers
Canadian hip hop record producers
Canadian male rappers
Musicians from British Columbia
People from North Vancouver
People from Surrey, British Columbia